Oru Thekkan Thallu Case is a 2022 Indian Malayalam-language action comedy film directed by Sreejith N. and written by Rajesh Pinnadan, based on the short story Ammini Pilla Vettu Case by G. R. Indugopan. The film stars Biju Menon, Padmapriya, Roshan Mathew, and Nimisha Sajayan. The film is produced by Mukesh R. Mehta, Sunil A. K., and C. V. Sarathi.

The film marked Padmapriya’s comeback to a Malayalam cinema after a gap of five years. The film released in September 2022. It received positive reviews upon release and turned out to be a moderate success.

Plot 
Podiyan Pilla's lover, Vasanthi, and Ammini Pilla's wife, Rukmini, are neighbours and close friends. One of the most respected people in the town is Ammini Pilla. In the town, when Podiyan Pilla visits Vasanthi for sex one night, Ammini sees it and slaps him. Podiyan Pilla became enraged by this and attacks Ammini Pilla in the dark, with his friends. During the attack, Podiyan hacks Ammini Pilla and he is bedridden for a couple of months as a result of the attack. In order to teach Podiyan Pilla and his friends a lesson, he decides to do so in such a way that society will acknowledge it as well. The ego of Podiyan Pilla and his friends are hurt when Ammini chose not to file a lawsuit, but instead decided to deal with things on his own. They are not sure what to do about the crisis and are looking for a way to ensure that they do not face Ammini's wrath. Vengeance is taken by Ammini, one by one against Podiyan's friends, who are relieved of the stress of Ammini's revenge. In the meantime, Vasanthi finds out she is pregnant before her upcoming wedding with Podiyan Pilla. The couple fled to a hideout where Podiyan was supplied by his friends. Even though Ammini has not yet slapped Podiyan, Rukmini insists that the wedding goes on as soon as possible. While Ammini Pilla is in his lighthouse just before the wedding, his wife Rukmini and Podiyan lock him inside to ensure Podiyan does not have to go to the wedding slapped. The moment Rukmini realises that she has made the wrong decision and tries to open the door, but to no avail. Aminni jumps out the lighthouse window to escape and breaks his arm. On the wedding day, Rukmini takes revenge for her husband by slapping Podiyan as Aminni was present at the wedding. The film ends with Podiyan and his friends in a car heading towards the wall where Aminni had crossed off their names when they were slapped. Aminni was standing there without Podiyan's name crossed off, leaving the movie on a cliffhanger.

Cast 
 Biju Menon as Ammini Pilla
 Padmapriya as Rukmini, Ammini's wife
 Roshan Mathew as Podiyan Pilla
 Nimisha Sajayan as Vasanthi, Podiyan's girlfriend
 Akhil Kavalayoor as Kunjukunju
 Aswath Lal as Lopez 
 Reju Sivadas as Prabhakkuttan 
 Arun Pavumpa as Kunjipakki
 Azeez Nedumangad
 Pramod Veliyanad as Astrologer 
 Prasanth Murali
 Achuthananthan
 Sasi Valooran
 Neeraja Rajendran as Vasanthi's mother 
 Jayaraj

Production 
On 14 July 2021, Biju Menon announced that his next film would be Oru Thekkan Thallu Case and released the film's first look graphic poster of the four pivotal characters. On 10 November 2021, Nimisha Sajayan informed that the principal photography of the film would start soon. In February 2022, the crew of the film announced that the shoot of the film is completed.

Soundtrack 
The music of the film is composed by Justin Varghese.

Release 
Oru Thekkan Thallu Case released in theatres on 8 September 2022.

References

External links 
 

2020s Malayalam-language films
2022 films
Indian action comedy films